Giselher, Gisilher, Gisiler, or Giseler is a Germanic masculine given name. It may refer to:

Giselher of Burgundy, Burgundian king
Gisilher (archbishop of Magdeburg), German ecclesiastic
Giselher Klebe (1925–2009), German composer
Giselher Wilke (1922–2007), German army officer

See also
Gislhere (died circa 785), English Bishop of Selsey

German masculine given names